"Ese" (English: He's The One) is a song performed by Puerto Rican-American singer Jerry Rivera from his ninth studio album De Otra Manera (1998). The song became his first #1 on the Hot Latin Tracks chart and fifth overall on the Tropical Airplay chart. It was acknowledged as an award-winning song at the 2000 BMI Latin Awards. Two versions of the song were recorded, one in salsa and the other a bolero. The success of releasing two versions of the song to Latin radio stations led to Sony Discos having their artists record multiple versions of the same song. José A. Estévez, Jr. of AllMusic felt that Rivera "demonstrates with conviction" in the song. Eliseo Cardona of El Nuevo Heradl stated that the song "can be taken as a signal of alert (and also of alarm) It shows in any case that it was already time to get out of the monotony accumulated by his discography After listening to the song (also recorded in salsa) it is force majeure to recognize that the latter was fulfilled." The song was later featured as the main theme for the Mexican telenovela Mirada de mujer (1998).

Charts

Weekly charts

Year-end charts

See also
List of number-one Billboard Hot Latin Tracks of 1999
List of Billboard Tropical Airplay number ones of 1999

References

1998 singles
1998 songs
Jerry Rivera songs
Sony Discos singles
Spanish-language songs
Telenovela theme songs
1990s ballads
Boleros
Latin ballads
Pop ballads